Saphenista chorfascia is a species of moth of the family Tortricidae. It is found in Morona-Santiago Province, Ecuador.

The wingspan is about 18 mm. The ground colour of the forewings is cream white, with whitish along the edges of the markings and brownish suffusions. The hindwings are whitish cream, but darker on the periphery.

Etymology
The species name refers to the fascia of the forewing and is derived from Greek chorizo (meaning disconnect).

References

Moths described in 2007
Saphenista